The State of Australia's Birds (SOAB) is a report series that tracks trends in Australia's bird populations.

From 2003–2010, this was delivered as an annual report produced by the Royal Australasian Ornithologists Union (now known as BirdLife Australia) in the form of an illustrated colour magazine supplement. The 2015 version of the report marks the beginning of a new era in the series, with the introduction of the Australian Bird Index.

Overview
The SOAB reports collate and analyse information on trends in the conservation status of bird populations in Australia.

Some of the material presented in SOAB is extracted from BirdLife Australia's monitoring projects, notably the Atlas of Australian Birds citizen science project.

All issues are available for free download.

2003-2010 Reports
The reports were published as supplements to Wingspan magazine. The 2003 and 2008 editions of SOAB were five-yearly overviews, while the other editions were themed on various aspects of Australian avifauna (for example, SOAB 2010 was themed on Birds and Islands).

2015 and Future Reports
The 2015 (SOAB) report launched the first Australian Bird Indices for terrestrial birds and introduces Australia's Red List Index (RLI), a means of tracking trends in the status of Australia's most threatened bird groups.

BirdLife Australia plan to release a comprehensive SOAB report in 2020, that will include indices for all of Australia's bioregions, highlight trends for a wide range of terrestrial species, and provide an evaluation of the monitoring gaps. The 2020 report also aims to incorporate information from the National Environmental Science Program Threatened Species Index project, the first iteration of which was a Threatened Bird Index, showing declines across multiple threatened bird taxa.

List of issues
 The State of Australia's Birds 2003
 The State of Australia's Birds 2004: Water, wetlands and birds
 The State of Australia's Birds 2005: Woodlands and Birds
 The State of Australia's Birds 2006: Invasive Species
 The State of Australia's Birds 2007: Birds in a Changing Climate
 The State of Australia's Birds 2008: A Five Year Review
 The State of Australia's Birds 2009: Restoring Woodland Habitats for Birds
 The State of Australia's Birds 2010: Islands and Birds
 The State of Australia's Birds 2015: Headline Trends for Terrestrial Birds

References

Notes

Sources
 Ehmke,G., Cunningham, R., O’Connor, J., Garnett, S., Lau, J., Herman, K. (Eds). 2014. The State of Australia's Birds 2015: Headline Trends for Terrestrial Birds. BirdLife Australia, Melbourne. 
 Kirkwood, J. and O'Connor, J. (Eds). 2010. The State of Australia's Birds 2010: Islands and Birds. Supplement to Wingspan Vol. 20, No. 4, 2010. Birds Australia, Melbourne. .
 Olsen, P. (Ed). 2007. The State of Australia's Birds 2007: Birds in a Changing Climate. Supplement to Wingspan Vol. 17, No. 4, 2007. Birds Australia, Melbourne. .
 Olsen, P. (Ed). 2008. The State of Australia's Birds 2008: A Five Year Review. Supplement to Wingspan Vol. 18, No. 4, 2008. Birds Australia, Melbourne. .
 Olsen, P., Silcocks, A. and Weston, M. (Eds). 2006. The State of Australia's Birds 2006: Invasive Species. Supplement to Wingspan Vol. 16, No. 4, 2006. Birds Australia, Melbourne. .
 Olsen, P. and Weston, M. (Eds). 2004. The State of Australia's Birds 2004: Water, wetlands and birds. Supplement to Wingspan Vol. 14, No. 4, 2004. .
 Olsen, P., Weston, M., Cunningham, R. and Silcocks, A. (Eds). 2003. The State of Australia's Birds 2003. Supplement to Wingspan Vol. 13, No. 4, 2003. Birds Australia, Melbourne. .
 Olsen, P., Weston, M., Tzaros, C. and Silcocks, A. (Eds). 2005. The State of Australia's Birds 2005: Woodlands and Birds. Supplement to Wingspan Vol. 15, No. 4, 2005. Birds Australia, Melbourne. .
 Paton, D. and O'Connor, J. (Eds). 2009. The State of Australia's Birds 2009: Restoring Woodland Habitats for Birds. Supplement to Wingspan Vol. 19, No. 4, 2009. Birds Australia, Melbourne. .

External links
State of Australia's Birds 2015
State of Australia's Birds Report Series
BirdLife Australia

2003 establishments in Australia
Annual magazines published in Australia
Magazines published in Australia

Bird conservation
Environmental magazines
Journals and magazines relating to birding and ornithology
Magazines established in 2003
Magazines published in Melbourne
Wildlife magazines